1. deild is the second tier league of football in the Faroe Islands. It was founded in 1943. The league is organised by the Faroe Islands Football Association. It was originally the top level of Faroe Islands football but was replaced by the Faroe Islands Premier League in 2005.

The league has 10 participating clubs. At the end of each season, two teams are relegated and two promoted from the 2. deild, pending the fact that the promoted team does not already have a team in 1. deild. In such cases, the team that finished third will be promoted instead. If a team is relegated to 1. deild and already have a side playing there, their reserve team will move one division down, thereby saving another team from relegation.

History
Founded in 1943 as Meðaldeildin, it acts in a system of promotion and relegation with the top division since 1976, when the Faroe Islands football league system was reorganized. Back then, 1. deild was the name given to the top division, replacing the Meistaradeildin. The first club to be promoted was Fram Tórshavn after winning the division for the first time in their history. The first team relegated to the league was NSÍ Runavík.

2020 teams
 07 Vestur
 B36 Tórshavn II
 B68 Toftir
 B71 Sandoy
 HB Tórshavn II
 KÍ Klaksvík II
 NSÍ Runavík II
 Skála II
 Víkingur II
 FC Hoyvík - promoted as the winner of the 2019 2. deild
 Argja Bóltfelag II - promoted as the runner up of the 2019 2. deild

List of seasons

Performance by club

In bold the clubs currently playing in 1. deild. 
In italics the clubs that no longer exist or are no longer active in adult football.

See also
2. deild
3. deild

Notes

References

External links
1. deild at Faroe Soccer 

 
2
Far